Corythucha confraterna is a species of lace bug in the family Tingidae. It is found in Central America and North America.

References

Further reading

 
 

Tingidae
Articles created by Qbugbot
Insects described in 1918